Sasha Gatt (born 22 June 2005) is a Maltese swimmer. She competed at the 2020 Summer Olympics in Women's 400 m freestyle, and Women's 1500 m freestyle. She also competed in the women's 1500 metre freestyle event at the 2020 European Aquatics Championships, in Budapest, Hungary.

2020 Olympic Games 
On the 12 December, 2020, Gatt qualified at age 15 for the 2020 Tokyo Summer Olympics for the 1500m freestyle race with a time of 17:00.28. Later, on the 6 June, 2021 Sasha Gatt also qualified for the 400m freestyle race at a time of 4:18.58.

Gatt was in heat 2, lane 7 for the 400m freestyle race. With the time of 4:19.75, she finished 6th in her heat and 22nd in the event. The next day, she swam in the women's 1500m freestyle race. Gatt finished third out of three in her heat, with a time of 16:57.47, which was her PB.

References

External links
 

2005 births
Living people
Maltese female swimmers
Maltese female freestyle swimmers
Place of birth missing (living people)
Swimmers at the 2020 Summer Olympics
Olympic swimmers of Malta